Thomas Stanley Attenborough (19 October 1915 – 18 April 1972) was an Australian rules footballer who played with North Melbourne in the Victorian Football League (VFL).

Attenborough won the 1945 Morwell Wartime Football Club best and fairest award, when playing in the Central Gippsland Wartime Football League.

Notes

External links 

1915 births
1972 deaths
Australian rules footballers from Victoria (Australia)
North Melbourne Football Club players